Fingerlings 4 is the fourth in Andrew Bird’s series of live albums called Fingerlings. It features live recordings from the December 2009 Gezelligheid performances at 4th Presbyterian church in Chicago, IL. The album art was made by Jay Ryan.

Track listing

Other appearances

 A version of "Dance of Death" appears on the album The Ballad of the Red Shoes.
 Versions of "Danse Carribe," "The Sifters," and "Oh Baltimore" (renamed "Eyeoneye"), appear on the album Break It Yourself.
 "Carrion Suite" also appears on the bonus disc Useless Creatures, as does "You Woke Me Up!"; the latter contains added lyrics that would be reused in "Capsized" from the album Are You Serious.
 "Meet Me Here at Dawn" is a Cass McCombs cover, originally appearing on the album A.
 "Section 8 City" appears as a bonus track on Noble Beast.

References

Andrew Bird albums
2010 live albums